Alvar Hägglund (1913–1996) was a Swedish cross-country skier who competed in the 1930s. He won a silver medal in the 4 x 10 km at the 1939 FIS Nordic World Ski Championships in Zakopane. He also finished 6th in the 50 km event at those same games.

External links

1913 births
1996 deaths
Swedish male cross-country skiers
FIS Nordic World Ski Championships medalists in cross-country skiing